Masbate, officially the Province of Masbate (Masbateño: Probinsya san Masbate), is an island province in the Philippines located near the midsection of the nation's archipelago. Its provincial capital is Masbate City. The province consists of three major islands: Masbate, Ticao and Burias.

Masbate is at the crossroads of two island groups: Visayas and Luzon. It is politically part of Bicol Region in the latter. However, from a bio-geographic and socio-ethno-linguistic perspective, Masbate is in Luzon.

History
Masbate is one of the oldest settlements in the Philippines. Archaeological records show that Batungan (in Mandaon) and Bagumbayan (in Palanas) were major settlement sites during the Bronze Age (4000-1000 BC). The development of bronze metallurgy in South-East Asia coincided with an increasingly hierarchical society, firmly based on agricultural village settlements. It was these crucial changes, the introduction of new technologies, new social forms, and a new economic base, which culminated in the foundation of the proto-urban settlements of the 1st millennium AD. A fine stone chisel from Mount Batungan is dated to the twelfth century BC. Of the age of Philippine neoliths, it is only possible to say that polished stone adzes from Masbate have been dated from 2710 BC to AD 179.2 Kalanay (in Aroroy) was an island site from 1000 BC-AD 850 (early metal). Masbateño burial jars and a small pottery skull box found in caves dated to the beginning of the Christian era. Exquisite goldwork represents an old Philippine wealth in both an economic and an artistic sense: all sorts of wrought or molded ornaments and jewelry demonstrate both the availability of the raw material and the skill of the artisan – finger rings, earrings, head-bands, pendants, and pectoral ornaments, heavy chains with interlocking serrated edges, light filigree work, delicate necklaces of fine twisted wires, 12-millimeter beads composed of 184 separate granules soldered together, thin hammered sheets for decorating grosser objects like earplugs or the visages of corpses, and a charming little snail of unknown use. Productive mines in Benguet, Butuan, Masbate, and Paracale were in operation and gold being panned in riverbeds all over the archipelago when the Spaniards arrived.

During the Spanish regime, San Jacinto in Ticao Island was an anchorage point for the Manila-Acapulco-Manila galleons. The course as described by the standard pilot's guide of Cabrera Bueno was substantially followed by nearly all the galleons. The largest variations were in the height at which the eastward crossing was made and in the course laid off the coast of the Californias.

The successive stages were as follows: from Cavite on Manila Bay out through one of the bocas, generally between Mariveles and Corregidor; thence SSW, keeping well clear of Fortun to the left and high Ambil to the right; past Cape Santiago on the Luzon Coast, and E between Mindoro and Maricaban; by the Punta de Escarceo, or “Tide Rip Point,” where currents run strong, and under Isla Verde, outside Subaang Bay, within which there was a fair anchorage in case of need; SE past the islets of Baco, with a good channel off Calapan; SE by E down the Mindoro coast by Punta Gorda de Pola; E by SE between the Tres Reyes and the Dos Hermanas; thence by the wide bocanabetween Marinduque and Banton, out onto the tablazo, or open water, above Sibuyan; SE by E between Burias and Masbate; turning ENE around the Punta de San Miguel and the Punta del Diablo; coasting around the east side of Ticao to the anchorage at San Jacinto; clearing from thence and working out seaward with the monsoon; E right leagues, with the dangerous Naranjos to starboard and the shoal of Calantas to port; NE by N and then ENE seven leagues around Capul; NE with the Sorsogon coast to port and San Bernardino to starboard and NE by E seven leagues to the Embocadero, with San Bernardino now to port and the island of Biri to starboard. At this point, according to Cabrera, “the rapid currents require skillful pilot work.” The galleon was now in the open sea.

From the chronicles of the early years of Spanish colonization, a relacion (report) about Masbate first appeared in Fray Martin de Rada's letter dated July 1569 to the Viceroy of New Spain (Mexico), Marquis de Falces. He mentioned that in a place called Masbat there were plenty of gold mines. Other later documents such as Artieda's Relacion (1573) and Andres de Mirandaola's letter (1574) refer to a place called Masbat or Masbad. It wasn't until 1582 that Miguel de Loarca wrote about a place called Masbate.

In the same year that the Augustinian Fray de Rada wrote about Masbat's gold mines, his fellow Augustinian Fray Alonzo Jimenez landed in Burias and baptized its chieftain Buaya. This baptism is said to be the very first baptism in Luzon. Fray Jimenez also built a church in Burias before he sailed on to Ibalon in 1570. By 1575, Masbate had become a priority in the Augustinian Missionary Memoranda. Fray Francisco de Ortega reported on the pillaging activities of a pirate named Caxabic in the islands of Masbate and Burias. By 1600, the Spaniards had developed Mobo as a galleon shipyard and San Jacinto as a strategic port. In 1605, Masbate was officially an Augustinian Mission and it is first prior was Fray Francisco Guerrero. Masbate had about 250 tributes and 1000 Christian natives. In 1609, Fray Pedro de Arce, bishop-elect of Nueva Caceres, ceded the spiritual administration of Masbate to the Mitra (secular clergy). On May 28, 1682, bishop-elect Dominican Fray Andres Gonzales petitioned the King of Spain to revert some curacies of Nueva Caceres to the charge of religious communities. The petition was approved in 1685 and by 1687, the first Augustinian Recollect missionaries had sailed for the port of San Jacinto to begin the Recollect Mission in Masbate. In 1700, Fray Ildefonso de la Concepcion established the settlement of Uson as a visita (barrio) of Mobo. The town of Masbate was established in 1791 by Fray Manuel dela Virgen del Tremedal.

The jurisdiction of Nueva Caceres embraced the entire provinces of Camarines and Albay, as far as and including the islands of Ticao, Masbate, Burias, and Catanduanes; the province of Tayabas, as far as and including Lucban; and in the opposite coast of Maobàn, to Binangonan, Polo, Baler, and Casiguran. At one time, it was governed by his very illustrious Lordship Doctor Don Ysidoro de Arevalo, who was the bishop-elect. Records show that he enjoyed a yearly stipend of 4,000 pesos of common gold, in conformance with a royal decree. Likewise, a payment was made from the royal treasury, in virtue of a decree by the supreme government and the council of the royal treasury dated October 2, 1723, 200 pesos, for priests of the choir, at 100 pesos each, as assistants of the aforesaid illustrious lord. Another payment was made of 400 pesos, assigned to this church by the royal decree, dated at San Yldefonso on August 19, 1736; for the pay of singers, sacristans, and doorkeepers, and other expenses for worship and for the [care of the] building of the church. It likewise had a contribution of 232 pesos, 4 tomins, which was paid in 6 quintals of wax, l00 gantas of coconut-oil, and 4 arrobas of Castilian wine, in conformity with another royal decree dated February 21, 1705.

The administration of Masbate was given back to the Mitra after the Recollects left Masbate in 1794. All in all, over 60 Recollect missionaries were assigned in Masbate for a period of more than 100 years. Masbate became a separate politico-military command province in 1846. In 1864, it was declared a separate province from Albay. After a devastating typhoon in 1908, Masbate was annexed to the province of Sorsogon. It finally gained status as a separate province on December 15, 1920, by virtue of Commonwealth Act No. 2934. In Rafael Bernal's Book: "Mexico En Filipinas", Masbate was listed among other places which include Cavite and Pampanga, as areas where there were large concentrations of Mexican immigrants to the Philippines.

Geography

The province lies roughly at the center of the Philippine archipelago, between latitudes 11°43’ north and 123°09’ east and 124°5’ east. It is bounded on the north by Burias and Ticao Pass, east by San Bernardino Strait, south by the Visayan Sea, and west by the Sibuyan Sea. Relative to mainland Bicol, the province faces the southwestern coasts of Camarines Sur, Albay, and Sorsogon areas.

The general surface configuration of the province ranges from slightly undulating to rolling and from hilly to mountainous. In each island, the rugged topography is concentrated in the northeastern portion and gradually recedes to blunt hills and rolling areas in the south, southeast, and southwest.

Administrative divisions
Masbate comprises 20 municipalities and one city, all encompassed by 3 congressional districts.

Demographics

Language

There are four Visayan languages and one from Luzon, spoken in the province.

Masbateño or Minasbaté is a Visayan language unique to the province. It has 75-83% mutual intelligibility with Hiligaynon, another Visayan language spoken in the southwestern tip of Masbate island. Cebuano is another Visayan language spoken in the southeastern municipalities in the island. Waray is spoken in the islands of Ticao Island due to their proximity to mainland Northern Samar, especially to the southern portion parts of the Province of Sorsogon where Waray Sorsogon is spoken.

Minasbaté is spoken in Masbate City and its neighboring municipalities. 33% of the population speaks Hiligaynon and it is spoken mainly in the towns of Balud, Mandaon and the southwestern part of Milagros, while the remaining 9% speak Cebuano, mainly in the southern towns of Esperanza, Pio V. Corpuz and Placer. In northeastern Burias Island they speak Bicolano, while in Ticao Island they speak Waray  similarly as the people of Gubat, due to the island's proximity to the Northern Samar mainland.

The people generally speak English and Tagalog, though these languages are rarely used in everyday discourse. The people only use them when conversing with tourists and visitors from other Philippine regions and foreign nationals.

Religion
About 91% of the population are members of the Catholic Church (Statistics by Diocese Hierarchy, 2014). Devotional practices such as the rosary, novenas to saints, and other religious manifestations as processions, the Misa de Gallo and Holy Week traditional activities are still very much part of the way of life of most parishioners. The Diocese of Masbate was created on March 23, 1968, separating it from the Diocese of Sorsogon. It comprises then, and now, the civil province of Masbate with its 121 islands including the two larger ones Burias and Ticao. It is now a suffragan of the Archdiocese of Caceres. Its titular patron is St. Anthony of Padua.

There are a total 22 parishes in the Diocese of Masbate, ministered to by 43 priests and 11 religious sisters. It has 1 minor seminary, 4 pastoral centers, 3 elementary schools, 6 high schools, 1 college and 7 kindergarten schools. And among its faith communities are 20 BEC's 46 neo-catechumenal communities, 11 mandated organizations and 3 charismatic groups. Other denominations include the Aglipayan Church, the Members Church of God International, popularly called Ang Dating Daan, Jesus Miracle Crusade, Iglesia ni Cristo (Church of Christ) which also functions many religious and social events in the province, as well as Baptist, Methodist, The Church of Jesus Christ of Latter-day Saints (Mormons), Jehovah's Witnesses, Seventh-day Adventist and other Christians. Non Christians are also present which is commonly represented by Moslems.

Prior to colonization, the region had a complex religious system which involved various deities. Among these deities include: Gugurang, the supreme god who dwells inside of Mount Mayon where he guards and protects the sacred fire in which Aswang, his brother was trying to steal. Whenever people disobey his orders, wishes and commit numerous sins, he would cause Mount Mayon to burst lava as a sign of warning for people to mend their crooked ways. Ancient Bikolanos had a rite performed for him called Atang.; Asuang, the evil god who always tries to steal the sacred fire of Mount Mayon from his brother, Gugurang. Addressed sometimes as Aswang, he dwells mainly inside Mount Malinao. As an evil god, he would cause the people to suffer misfortunes and commit sins. Enemy of Gugurang and a friend of Bulan the god of the moon; Haliya, the masked goddess of the moonlight and the arch-enemy of Bakunawa and protector of Bulan. Her cult is composed primarily of women. There is also a ritual dance named after her as it is performed to be a counter-measure against Bakunawa.; Bulan, the god of the pale moon, he is depicted as a pubescent boy with uncommon comeliness that made savage beast and the vicious mermaids (Magindara) tame. He has deep affection towards Magindang, but plays with him by running away so that Magindang would never catch him. The reason for this is because he is shy to the man that he loves. If Magindang manages to catch Bulan, Haliya always comes to free him from Magindang's grip; Magindang, the god of the sea and all its creatures. He has deep affection to the lunar god Bulan and pursues him despite never catching him. Due to this, the Bicolanos reasoned that it is to why the waves rise to reach the moon when seen from the distant horizon. Whenever he does catch up to Bulan, Haliya comes to rescue Bulan and free him immediately; Okot, god of forest and hunting; and Bakunawa,  a gigantic sea serpent deity who is often considered as the cause of eclipses, the devourer of the sun and the moon, and an adversary of Haliya as Bakunawa's main aim is to swallow Bulan, who Haliya swore to protect for all of eternity.

Literacy
The literacy rate of the province stood at 95.90%.

Economy

Masbate is endowed with rich natural resources. In line with its agriculture are other industries such as large farming, livestock, and poultry raising. Along with its coastal areas, the fishing industry predominates. Agricultural lands are planted with rice, corn, root crops, and coconut.

Masbate ranks second to Bukidnon in raising cattle. About 70% of these are sold to Metro Manila and other provinces in Luzon and Visayas. Farming is the main source of livelihood. Copra is the leading product, followed by corn, rice and root crops. Fishing is a major industry along the coast.

Manufacturing firms are in the copra industry, handicrafts, furniture making, and fish processing.

Rich minerals are found in the province. Masbate is described by geologists as a province sitting on a "pot of gold". Other minerals found in the area are manganese, copper, silver, iron, chromite, limestone, guano, and carbon.

Cottage industries such as furniture and cabinet making, ceramics, garments, handicrafts, and metalcrafts, are likewise the source of livelihood.

Infrastructure
In an agricultural province, Masbate remains a net importer of consumer and industrial products. The supply of goods came from Metro Manila, Cebu, Panay, and Bicol Provinces. Construction materials, particularly cement, are sometimes sourced from as far as Iligan City in Mindanao.

Education
Major institutions of higher learning in the province include the state-supported Dr. Emilio B. Espinosa Sr. Memorial State College of Agriculture and Technology in Mandaon and in Masbate City, Osmeña Colleges, Masbate Colleges, Liceo de Masbate (a Catholic school with primary, secondary and tertiary educations under the directorship of the Diocese of Masbate), Southern Bicol College, Cataingan Municipal College. Masbate also has national schools in Aroroy, Cataingan, Placer, San Jacinto, Mandaon, Mobo, and Masbate City.

Other educational institutions include public and private schools such as the Masbate National Comprehensive High School in Masbate City that has two campuses: the Main Campus, which accommodates the Junior High School, and the Annex Campus which holds the Senior High School, Holy Name Academy (a Catholic institution run by the Augustinian Recollect Sisters in Palanas, Masbate) and Lucio Atabay Memorial Elementary School (formerly, Nipa Elem. School) in Nipa, Palanas, Masbate.

Tourism 
Masbate has several islands and beaches open to tourists. The province also holds a rodeo festival every summer.

References

External links

 
 
 
 Masbate Province Official Site
 Local Governance Performance Management System

 
Provinces of the Philippines
Island provinces of the Philippines
Islands of Luzon
Provinces of the Bicol Region
States and territories established in 1864
1864 establishments in the Philippines
Former sub-provinces of the Philippines